Coatbridge Sunnyside railway station serves the town of Coatbridge in North Lanarkshire, Scotland.

History 
All of these other than the northern portion of the M&KR to Gunnie yard and Gartsherrie remain in use today, though the Whifflet line has no timetabled passenger service and the route east of Airdrie was disused for more than 30 years prior to re-opening to passenger traffic in 2010.

Accidents and incidents 
On 30 September 1907, a passenger train collided with a light engin at the station. One person was killed and 43 were injured.
On 6 May 2022, an empty coaching stock train was derailed at the station. No one was injured in the accident.

Facilities

The station has a car park with 120 spaces and a cafe located on the covered platform.

Services
Monday to Saturday daytimes:
 2 Half-hourly services towards Edinburgh Waverley (both services are limited stops)
 Half-hourly service towards Airdrie
 Half-hourly service towards Balloch via Glasgow Queen Street Low Level
 Half-hourly service towards Helensburgh Central via Glasgow Queen Street Low Level
 Half-hourly service towards Milngavie via Glasgow Queen Street Low Level

Evening services are as follows:
 Half-hourly service towards Airdrie
 Half-hourly service towards Edinburgh Waverley
 Half-hourly service towards Balloch via Glasgow Queen Street Low Level
 Half-hourly service towards Helensburgh Central via Glasgow Queen Street Low Level

Sunday services are as follows:
 Half-hourly service towards Edinburgh Waverley
 Half-hourly service towards Helensburgh Central

References

Railway stations in North Lanarkshire
Former North British Railway stations
Railway stations in Great Britain opened in 1871
Railway stations served by ScotRail
SPT railway stations
Listed railway stations in Scotland
Category B listed buildings in North Lanarkshire
Coatbridge